Adley Stan Rutschman (born February 6, 1998) is an American professional baseball catcher for the Baltimore Orioles of Major League Baseball (MLB). He played college baseball for the Oregon State Beavers. He was named the Pac-12 Conference Player of the Year in 2019. The Orioles selected Rutschman with the first overall selection in the 2019 MLB draft, and he signed for $8.1 million, at the time the highest MLB draft signing bonus ever.

Amateur career
Rutschman attended Sherwood High School in Sherwood, Oregon, and was drafted by the Seattle Mariners in the 40th round of the 2016 Major League Baseball draft. He did not sign with the Mariners and attended Oregon State University, where he played college baseball for the Beavers.

Rutschman played college football for the Beavers as a placekicker his freshman year. In baseball, his freshman year, he played in 61 games, hitting .234/.322/.306 with two home runs and 33 runs batted in (RBI). After the 2017 season, he played collegiate summer baseball with the Falmouth Commodores of the Cape Cod Baseball League. As a sophomore in 2018, he batted .408/.505/.628 with nine home runs and 83 RBIs and helped lead Oregon State to win the 2018 College World Series, their 3rd NCAA Division I Baseball National Championship,. Rutschman had 17 hits, a College World Series record, and 13 RBIs in the series, for which he was named College World Series Most Outstanding Player. In 2019, his junior season, he batted .411/.575/.751 with 17 home runs and 58 RBIs. That year, Rutschman was named the 2019 Collegiate Baseball Player of the Year by Collegiate Baseball Newspaper.

Professional career
Rutschman was selected by the Baltimore Orioles with the first overall selection in the 2019 Major League Baseball draft. He signed for $8.1 million, the highest signing bonus at the time. He made his professional debut with the Gulf Coast League Orioles, and, after five games, was promoted to the Aberdeen IronBirds. After three weeks with the IronBirds, Rutschman was promoted to the Class A Delmarva Shorebirds of the South Atlantic League. Over 37 games between the three clubs, he slashed .254/.351/.423 with four home runs and 26 RBIs.

After the canceled 2020 minor league season, Rutschman was assigned to the Double-A Bowie Baysox to start the 2021 season. In June 2021, Rutschman was selected to play in the All-Star Futures Game. On August 9, 2021, Rutschman was promoted to Triple-A Norfolk Tides, after slashing a .271/.392/.508, with 18 home runs and 55 RBIs in 80 games with Bowie. He batted a .312/.405/.490 with 5 home runs and 20 RBIs in 43 games with Norfolk.

Rutschman competed for a spot on the Orioles 2022 Opening Day roster, but he missed the start of the season due to a strained triceps muscle. He began a rehabilitation assignment with Aberdeen on April 26. On May 21, 2022, Rutschman was promoted to the major leagues for the first time. During his first game, that same day, he got the start playing catcher and batting 6th in the lineup. His first major league at-bat resulted in a strikeout, but two at-bats later, he got his first hit, a triple. Rutschman finished the season hitting .254/.362/.445 with 35 doubles, 13 home runs and 42 RBIs in 113 games with Baltimore. He was voted the winner of the 2022 Louis M. Hatter Most Valuable Oriole Award by members of the local media.

Personal life
His grandfather, Ad Rutschman, was a football and baseball coach at Linfield College and is a member of the National Football Foundation College Hall of Fame.

Rutschman's nickname "Rooster" came from his inspiration to grow a mustache like the fictional character Lt. Bradley “Rooster” Bradshaw from the film Top Gun: Maverick.

References

External links

Oregon State Beavers bio

1998 births
Living people
People from Sherwood, Oregon
Baseball players from Portland, Oregon
All-American college baseball players
College World Series Most Outstanding Player Award winners
Major League Baseball catchers
Baltimore Orioles players
Oregon State Beavers baseball players
Oregon State Beavers football players
Falmouth Commodores players
Gulf Coast Orioles players
Aberdeen IronBirds players
Delmarva Shorebirds players
Bowie Baysox players
Norfolk Tides players